Lonnie Smith (born December 22, 1955) is an American former Major League Baseball left fielder. He made his debut for the Philadelphia Phillies on September 2, 1978 and later played for the St. Louis Cardinals, Kansas City Royals, Atlanta Braves, Pittsburgh Pirates, and Baltimore Orioles. He overcame bouts with drug abuse to become one of the top base-stealers in baseball during the 1980s, with the seventh-most steals. He played on five pennant-winning teams, three of which won the World Series.

Playing career

Minor Leagues
Smith began his minor league career with Auburn in the New York–Penn League in 1974. The following year, he led the league with 150 hits, 114 runs, and 56 stolen bases while playing for Spartanburg. In 1978, he led the league with 66 stolen bases while playing for Oklahoma City and scored 106 runs the following year again with Oklahoma City.

Philadelphia Phillies
The Phillies won the National League pennant and defeated the Kansas City Royals in the World Series. Smith's performance was strong enough for him to finish third in the Rookie of the Year balloting following the season. He continued to play well in the strike-shortened  season, hitting .324.

St. Louis Cardinals
Smith was traded to the St. Louis Cardinals in November 1981, for Lary Sorensen, in a deal which eventually netted the Phillies Bo Díaz. In fact, 1982 was a high-water year for Smith in several different ways:
Smith was in the MLB All-Star Game for the only time in his career in 1982. He had a batting average of .307, and on-base percentage of .381.
He led the National League with 120 runs scored, which was the only time that he scored 100+ runs in a season during his major league career.
Smith also set career highs in 1982 with 592 at-bats, 182 hits, 35 doubles, and 257 total bases during the regular season.
He also ranked second in the National league with a career-high 68 stolen bases, but he was also caught stealing a career-high 26 times. The Cardinals' manager, Whitey Herzog, had ordered his fastest players to attempt to steal bases whenever possible as part of his strategy for winning.

All of the above pushed Smith all the way up to second place in voting for the regular-season National League Most Valuable Player for 1982. That season, outfielder Dale Murphy of the Atlanta Braves won the National League MVP award, tying for the lead in runs batted in and walloping 36 home runs.

Smith batted a healthy .321 during the 1982 World Series, and he helped the Cardinals to defeat the Milwaukee Brewers, four games to three.

Towards the end of his first season with the Cardinals, Smith infamously attacked the Phillie Phanatic. Despite his speed, Smith was known for occasionally tripping and falling while running. He attributed this to being "pigeon-toed" as a child. During a series between the Cardinals and the Phillies in September 1982, the Phillie Phanatic began mimicking Smith at close range before the game, doing belly-whops on the turf. Tired of the mocking, Smith tackled the Phanatic, reportedly injuring the mascot's ankles. Despite this, Smith was still allowed to play, so when he took his position in left field, Phillies fans started throwing beer bottles at him. Rather than seeking shelter, Smith turned around, threw up his arms, and taunted them, daring them to hit him, which none did.

Smith continued to play well during , batting .321 (which placed him second in the National League only to Bill Madlock's .323), but in just 130 games, to again draw some MVP votes. However, this baseball season was struck with his first bout with illicit drug abuse, which sidelined him for a month at mid-season during a highly publicized rehabilitation stint at the Hyland Center in St. Louis.

Smith returned to the Cardinals after his time on the bench in 1983, and he remained with them through the end of the  baseball season.

Kansas City Royals
Smith was traded to the Royals in exchange for outfielder John Morris on May 17, 1985. The Royals were able to fill their left field spot with Smith; they had lacked an everyday player since the departure of Amos Otis two years earlier. Smith's past met his present following the regular season, when he hit .333 in the 1985 World Series to lead the Royals to a seven-game upset of the favored Cardinals. When Smith took the field in Game 1 of the 1985 World Series, he became the first player in MLB history to play in the World Series against a team that traded him away within the same season.

Pittsburgh drug trials 
Smith testified in the Pittsburgh drug trials of September 1985. As with other major league players, he was granted immunity from prosecution in exchange for his testimony. In February 1986, Smith, along with six other players, was determined to have been a prolonged drug user who had also facilitated distribution to other players, and was suspended for a full season. All the suspended players were allowed to continue playing under the condition that they donated ten percent of their base salaries to drug-related community service, submitted to random drug testing, and contributed 100 hours of drug-related community service.

In July 1987, Smith told the Kansas City Times that under his agreement with the commissioner of baseball, he was supposed to be tested six to eight times per-year but had not been tested so far during 1987. More so, he strongly disagreed with Commissioner Ueberroth that professional baseball was free from illicit drugs.

Following the 1987 season, Smith had trouble finding a new team to play with, and he came to think that then-Royals general manager John Schuerholz had blackballed him. By his own account, Smith was depressed and also addicted to cocaine when he considered murdering Schuerholz, and even purchased a pistol for that purpose. Smith had second thoughts about committing such a serious crime, however, and he dropped the idea entirely.

Atlanta Braves
During Spring training, he made it to the team's 25-man roster, but he batted just .237 in limited playing time that season. However, in 1989, he cracked the starting line-up for the Braves' outfield, and he went on to accomplish one of his best baseball seasons ever. During that season, Smith had a batting average of .315, and also had a career-high total of 21 home runs. Smith also led the National League with a .415 on-base percentage. Smith finished 11th in the voting of N.L. Most Valuable Player, and he was awarded the MLB Comeback Player of the Year Award.

Smith's play in 1991 helped the Braves improve from their National League West last-place finish in 1990 to winning the National League pennant in 1991, resulting in a World Series appearance for the first time since 1958, when the Braves were based in Milwaukee.

1991 World Series
Smith committed a base-running blunder very late in Game 7 of the 1991 World Series versus the Minnesota Twins. Smith was on first base with no outs in the eighth inning of this scoreless game. Then the Braves' batter Terry Pendleton struck a line-drive double to left field. It appeared that Smith should have been able to score on this hit, but as he was rounding second base he paused, then having to stop at third base. Smith later stated that he had lost sight of the baseball against the ceiling of the Metrodome, though replays from the TV coverage of the game showed that the Twins' second baseman Chuck Knoblauch and shortstop Greg Gagne had potentially deceived Smith; Knoblauch pretended to throw to Gagne for a force, but didn't actually have the ball.

Regardless of the cause, Smith only advanced to third base. After a ground-out (the runners could not advance) and an intentional walk (which loaded the bases), Smith was forced out at home plate in a double play, leaving the Braves scoreless. The score remained 0–0 through the end of the ninth inning.

The Twins went on to score one run in the bottom of the tenth inning, taking the game 1–0, and winning the World Series four games to three. Smith hit three home runs in the Series.

Later career 
Smith remained with the Braves through the end of the  season, and he helped the Braves win the National League pennant once again, though they lost the World Series four games to two against the Toronto Blue Jays. Smith hit a grand slam in game five of that series.

Next, Smith departed from the Braves, and he signed up with the Pittsburgh Pirates, where he played one season. He was acquired by the Baltimore Orioles from the Pirates on September 8, 1993 in a transaction that was completed six days later on September 14 when a pair of minor leaguers, outfielder Stanton Cameron and left-handed pitcher Terry Farrar, were sent to Pittsburgh. Primarily used as a pinch-hitter, Smith played in his final major league game on August 10, 1994, in the Orioles' last game before that year's strike. He was granted free agency for the last time the following October 24.

Career statistics
In 1613 games over 17 seasons, Smith compiled a .288 batting average (1488-for-5170) with 909 runs, 273 doubles, 58 triples, 98 home runs, 533 RBI, 370 stolen bases, 623 base on balls, a .371 on-base percentage and a .420 slugging percentage. His career fielding percentage was .964. In five World Series and six playoff series, Smith hit .278 (57-for-205) with 28 runs scored, 4 home runs and 17 RBI.

Baseball historian Bill James wrote about Lonnie Smith's difficulties playing defense. He wryly stated that Smith should have had a post-retirement career teaching (so-called) "defensive recovery and cost containment" since he had excelled at recovering from defensive difficulties in the outfield.

Retirement
After retiring from pro baseball, Smith married once more, and he and his wife returned to Atlanta to reside. They became the parents of three children. Smith briefly re-entered national attention in 2006, when he told The State, a newspaper from Columbia, South Carolina, about his notion to murder Schuerholz 18 years earlier.

On June 18, 2015, sportswriter Jon Bois published a video documentary on Lonnie Smith and his history throughout his career, including the cocaine habits, near murder of Schuerholz, and his redemption with the Braves.

Records and achievements
 Smith is the only player to be a member of three different World Series winning teams (the Phillies, Cardinals, and Royals) within a single decade, and he did this in a six-year period.
 Smith set a franchise record for the St. Louis Cardinals on September 4, 1982, when he stole five bases in a single game.
 Smith won the National League's runs-scored championship in 1982, when he scored 120 runs for the St. Louis Cardinals. In that baseball season, he led the Cardinals to the National League pennant and also a World Series championship. This was also his only baseball season in which he was selected to play on the National League All-Star Team.

See also
List of Major League Baseball annual runs scored leaders
List of Major League Baseball career stolen bases leaders
List of sportspeople sanctioned for doping offences
Major League Baseball Scandals

References

External links

The 100 Greatest Royals of All-Time- #71 Lonnie Smith

1955 births
Living people
African-American baseball players
Águilas del Zulia players
American expatriate baseball players in Venezuela
Atlanta Braves players
Auburn Phillies players
Baltimore Orioles players
Baseball players from Chicago
Kansas City Royals players
Major League Baseball left fielders
Major League Baseball players suspended for drug offenses
National League All-Stars
Oklahoma City 89ers players
Omaha Royals players
Philadelphia Phillies players
Pittsburgh Pirates players
Richmond Braves players
Spartanburg Phillies players
Baseball players from Atlanta
St. Louis Cardinals players
21st-century African-American people
20th-century African-American sportspeople